= Docomo STYLE series F-10C =

docomo STYLE series F-10C
- Brand: NTT Docomo
- Developer: Fujitsu
- Manufacturer: Fujitsu
- Type: Feature phone
- Series: docomo STYLE series
- First released: June 4, 2011
- Compatible networks: 3G: FOMA (W-CDMA) (800 MHz, 850 MHz, 1.7 GHz, 2 GHz); 2G: GSM (900 MHz, 1800 MHz, 1900 MHz)
- Form factor: Clamshell
- Colors: Cosmetic Pink; Rose Gold; PRECIOUS Black
- Dimensions: 111 mm (4.4 in) H 51 mm (2.0 in) W 11.8 mm (0.46 in) D
- Weight: 110 g (3.9 oz)
- Operating system: Symbian OS + OPP(S)
- CPU: SH-Mobile G4
- Removable storage: microSD (up to 2 GB), microSDHC (up to 32 GB)
- Rear camera: 12.2 MP CMOS, f/2.8 (approx.), autofocus, image stabilization, face recognition
- Front camera: 0.32 MP CMOS
- Display: Main: 3.3 in TFT LCD, 480 x 854 pixels, 16,777,216 colors Sub: 0.8 in OLED, 39 x 96 pixels, 1 color
- Water resistance: IPX5/IPX8

docomo STYLE series F-10C is a 3rd generation mobile communication system (FOMA) terminal manufactured by Fujitsu for NTT Docomo. It is part of the docomo STYLE series.

== History ==
- February 23, 2011 – Passed TELEC certification.
- April 1, 2011 – Passed FCC certification.
- May 16, 2011 – Announced by NTT Docomo.
- June 4, 2011 – Sales began.

== Specifications ==
Although designated as part of the docomo STYLE series, the device features high-end hardware specifications including a 12.2-megapixel camera, IPX5/IPX8 water resistance, IP5X dust resistance, GPS, Bluetooth, and GSM support. It measures 11.8 mm in thickness, making it thinner than the contemporary F-11C.

The design incorporates a crystal-style back panel with illumination lights at two corners that glow during incoming calls and conversations. The sub-display can show customizable animations.

It includes a gyro sensor, an accelerometer, a temperature/humidity sensor, a geomagnetic digital compass, and a fingerprint sensor. It also features a built-in FM transmitter, 1seg TV reception capabilities, and physical security functions such as Secret Mode, microSD password protection, and Close Lock.

The main camera utilizes a 12.2-megapixel "Exmor for mobile" CMOS sensor combined with a "Milbeaut Mobile" image processing engine, supporting full HD (1920×1080) video recording and a Quick Shooting mode.

The device runs Symbian OS with OPP(S) and features the "Smart Browser" for accelerated web browsing.

It supports 50MB i-motion long-form video streaming, Content Packages, and software applications including the exercise counter, "Natsuki Takahashi Walking/Running App," and Tadashi Ezure Golf Swing Check app.

The messaging interface supports scheduled email transmission and automatic response rules alongside over 2,000 preset Deco-mail pictograms. The camera software incorporates an Art Camera mode (including miniature, vivid, monochrome, sepia, and fisheye effects), HDR synthesis, Search-Me Focus, background defocus mode, Best Shot Select, and beauty mode features.

== See also ==
- F-04C
- F-09C
- F-11C
